Peter Carl Fabergé, also known as Karl Gustavovich Fabergé (Karl Gustavovich Faberzhe; 30 May 1846 – 24 September 1920), was a Russian jeweller best known for the famous Fabergé eggs made in the style of genuine Easter eggs, but using precious metals and gemstones rather than more mundane materials. He was one of the sons of the founder of the famous jewelry legacy House of Fabergé.

Early life

Faberge was born in Saint Petersburg, Russia, to the Baltic German jeweller Gustav Fabergé and his German wife Charlotte Jungstedt, the daughter of Katarina Augusta Hertig and Karl Jungstedt. Gustav Fabergé's paternal ancestors were Huguenots, originally from La Bouteille, Picardy, who fled from France after the revocation of the Edict of Nantes, first to Germany near Berlin, then in 1800 to the Pernau (today Pärnu) Baltic province of Livonia, then part of Russia, now Estonia.

Until he was 14 years old he went to the German St Anne School in Saint Petersburg, Russia. In 1860 his father retired from his jewelry business and moved with his family to Germany. He left the House of Fabergé in Saint Petersburg in the hands of his business partner. Carl Fabergé undertook a course at the Dresden Arts and Crafts School. In 1862 Agathon Fabergé, the Fabergés' second son, was born in Dresden, Germany, where he went to school as well.

In 1864, Peter Carl Fabergé embarked upon a Grand Tour of Europe. He received tuition from respected goldsmiths in Germany, France and England, attended a course at Schloss's Commercial College in Paris, and viewed the objects in the galleries of Europe's leading museums.

His travel and study continued until 1872, when at the age of 26 he returned to St. Petersburg and married Augusta Julia Jacobs. 1874 saw the arrival of his first child, Eugene Fabergé and two years later, Agathon Fabergé was born; Alexander Fabergé and Nicholas Fabergé followed in 1877 and 1884 respectively. For the following 10 years, his father's trusted workmaster Hiskias Pendin acted as his mentor and tutor. The company was also involved with cataloguing, repairing, and restoring objects in the Hermitage during the 1870s. In 1881 the business moved to larger street-level premises at 16/18 Bolshaya Morskaya.

Taking over the family business

Upon the death of Hiskias Pendin in 1882, Carl Fabergé took sole responsibility for running the company. Carl was awarded the title Master Goldsmith, which permitted him to use his own hallmark in addition to that of the firm. In 1885 his brother Agathon Fabergé joined the firm and became Carl Faberge's main assistant in the designing of jewelry.

Carl and Agathon Fabergé Sr. were a sensation at the Pan-Russian Exhibition held in Moscow in 1882. Carl was awarded a gold medal and the St. Stanislav Medal. One of the Fabergé pieces displayed was a replica of a 4th-century BC gold bangle from the Scythian Treasure in the Hermitage. The Tsar, Alexander III, "Emperor and Autocrat of all the Russians", declared that he could not distinguish the Fabergé's work from the original and ordered that objects by the House of Fabergé should be displayed in the Hermitage as examples of superb contemporary Russian craftsmanship. The House of Fabergé with its range of jewels was now within the focus of Russia's Imperial Court.

When Peter Carl took over the House, there was a move from producing jewellery in the then-fashionable French 18th century style to becoming artist-jewellers. 
Fabergé's production of the very first so-called Fabergé egg, the Hen Egg,  given as a gift from the Tsar to his wife Maria Fyodorovna on Orthodox Easter (24 March) of 1885 so delighted her that on 1 May the Emperor assigned Fabergé the title Goldsmith by special appointment to the Imperial Crown of that year. This meant that Fabergé now had full personal access to the important Hermitage Collection, where he was able to study and find inspiration for developing his unique personal style. Influenced by the jewelled bouquets created by the eighteenth century goldsmiths Jean-Jacques Duval and Jérémie Pauzié, Fabergé re-worked their ideas combining them with his accurate observations and his fascination for Japanese art.  This resulted in a revival of the lost art of enameling and a focus on the setting of every single gemstone in a piece to its best visual advantage. Indeed, it was not unusual for Agathon to make ten or more wax models so that all possibilities could be exhausted before deciding on a final design. Shortly after Agathon joined the firm, the House introduced objects deluxe: gold bejewelled items embellished with enamel ranging from electric bell pushes to cigarette cases and including objects de fantaisie.

Easter eggs

In light of the Empress' response to receiving one of Fabergé's eggs on Easter, the Tsar soon commissioned the company to make an Easter egg as a gift for her every year thereafter. The Tsar placed an order for another egg the following year. Beginning in 1887, the Tsar apparently gave Carl Fabergé complete freedom with regard to egg designs, which then became more and more elaborate. According to Fabergé Family tradition, not even the Tsar knew what form they would take— the only stipulation was that each one should be unique and each should contain a surprise.  Upon the death of Alexander III, his son, the next Tsar, Nicholas II, followed this tradition and expanded it by requesting that there be two eggs each year, one for his mother (who was eventually given a total of 30 such eggs) and one for his wife, Alexandra (who received another 20).  These Easter gift eggs are today distinguished from the other jeweled eggs Fabergé ended up producing by their designation as "Imperial Easter eggs" or "Tsar Imperial Easter eggs". The tradition continued until the October Revolution when the entire Romanov dynasty was executed and the eggs and many other treasures were confiscated by the interim government.  The two final eggs were never delivered nor paid for.

Although today the House of Fabergé is famed for its Imperial Easter eggs, it made many more objects ranging from silver tableware to fine jewelry which were also of exceptional quality and beauty, and until its departure from Russia during the revolution, Fabergé's company became the largest jewelry business in the country. In addition to its Saint Petersburg headquarters, it had branches in Moscow, Odessa, Kiev and London. It produced some 150,000 to 200,000 objects from 1882 until 1917.

In 1900, Fabergé's work represented Russia at the 1900 World's Fair in Paris. As Carl Fabergé was a member of the jury, the House of Fabergé exhibited hors concours (without competing). Nevertheless, the House was awarded a gold medal and the city's jewelers recognized Carl Fabergé as a maître. Additionally, France recognized Carl Fabergé with one of the most prestigious of French awards, appointing him a knight of the Legion of Honour. Two of Carl's sons and his head workmaster were also honored. Commercially, the exposition was a great success and the firm acquired a great many orders and clients.

Stock, Russian Revolution and nationalisation
In 1916, the House of Fabergé became a joint-stock company with a capital of 3 million rubles.

The following year upon the outbreak of the October Revolution, the business was taken over by a 'Committee of the Employees of the Company K Fabergé'. In 1918 The House of Fabergé was seized by the Bolsheviks. In early October the stock was confiscated. The House of Fabergé was no more. 

After the nationalisation of the business, Carl Fabergé left St. Petersburg on the last diplomatic train for Riga. In mid-November, the Revolution having reached Latvia, he fled to Germany and first settled in Bad Homburg and then in Wiesbaden. Eugène, the Fabergés' eldest, travelled with his mother in darkness by sleigh and on foot through snow-covered woods and reached Finland in December 1918. During June 1920, Eugène reached Wiesbaden and accompanied his father to Switzerland where other members of the family had taken refuge at the Bellevue Hotel in Pully, near Lausanne.

Peter Carl Fabergé never recovered from the shock of the Russian Revolution. He died in Switzerland on September 24, 1920. His family believed he died of a broken heart. His wife, Augusta, died in 1925. The two were reunited in 1929 when Eugène Fabergé took his father's ashes from Lausanne and buried them in his mother's grave at the Cimetière du Grand Jas in Cannes, France.

Fabergé had five sons, four of whom lived to adulthood: Eugène (1874–1960), Agathon (1876–1951), Alexander (1877–1952), Nikolai (1881-1883), and Nicholas (1884–1939).  Descendants of Peter Carl Fabergé live in mainland Europe, Scandinavia and South America.

Personal life
Henry Bainbridge, a manager of the London branch of the House of Fabergé, recorded recollections of his meetings with his employer in both his autobiography and the book he wrote about Fabergé. The autobiography also given an insight into the man from the recollections of François Birbaum, Fabergé's senior master craftsman from 1893 until the House's demise.

Memorials 

 Ukraine, Kyiv, Khreschatyk Street, Building 15 (25) - Commemorative plaque.

References

Bibliography 
 Tatiana Fabergé, Lynekmkmtte G. Proler, Valentin V, Skurlov. The Fabergé Imperial Easter Eggs (London, Christie's 1997) 
 The History of the House of Fabergé according to the recollections of the senior master craftsman of the firm, Franz P. Birbaum (St Petersburg, Fabergé and Skurlov, 1992)
 Henry Charles Bainbridge. Peter Carl Fabergé – Goldsmith and Jeweller to the Russian Imperial Court – His Life and Work (London 1979, Batsfords – later reprints available such as New York, Crescent Books, 1979)
 A Kenneth Snowman The Art of Carl Fabergé (London, Faber & Faber, 1953–68)SBN 571 05113 8
 Geza von Habsburg Fabergé (Geneva, Habsburg, Feldman Editions, 1987) 
 Alexander von Solodkoff & others. Masterpieces from the House of Fabergé (New York, Harry N Abrahams, 1984)  * Géza von Habsburg Fabergé Treasures of Imperial Russia (Link of Times Foundation, 2004) 
 Toby Faber. Faberge's Eggs: The Extraordinary Story of the Masterpieces That Outlived an Empire (New York: Random House, 2008) 
 Gerald Hill. Faberge and the Russian Master Goldsmiths (New York: Universe, 2007) 
 A Kenneth Snowman, Carl Fabergé: Goldsmith to the Imperial Court of Russia (Random House, 1988),

External links

 Fabergé Research Site. One of the most comprehensive websites about the firm
 More facts from Faberge biography
 Empire of Eggs, Svetlana Graudt, Moscow Times, November 18, 2005

1846 births
1920 deaths
Burials at the Cimetière du Grand Jas
Peter Carl Faberge
Businesspeople from Saint Petersburg
People who emigrated to escape Bolshevism
Artists from the Russian Empire
19th-century businesspeople from the Russian Empire
Goldsmiths from the Russian Empire
Inventors from the Russian Empire
People from the Russian Empire of Danish descent
Baltic German people from the Russian Empire
Emigrants from the Russian Empire to Switzerland
Emigrants from the Russian Empire to Germany
Russian people of German descent
Russian people of Baltic German descent